Doraha is a city and a municipal council in Ludhiana district  in the state of Punjab, India.

Demographics
 India census, Doraha had a population of 39999. Males constitute 56% of the population and females 44%. Doraha has an average literacy rate of 71%, higher than the national average of 59.5%: male literacy is 74% and, female literacy is 66%. In Doraha, 12% of the population is under 6 years of age.

Political history and background

This city has the foot touch of the 6th Guru of Sikhism Sh. Hargobind Ji. Relating to him here are four places known as:  Gurudwara Damdama Sahib, Ber Sahib, Sarai Sahib, and Bauli Sahib.

This city has a great political background. This area has given two Chief Ministers. First was Gian Singh Rarewala and the other was Beant Singh Ji Kotli. His son Tej Parkash Singh M.L.A., Ex-Tpt. Minister Punjab, is looking after the area. Mihan Singh Gill was minister in the Govt. of Gian Singh Rarawala, Harnek Singh Mangewal was chairman of Warehouse Corporation Punjab in the Beant Singh Govt. and minister of state in the Govt. of Harcharan Singh Brar. Mangewal was more than a friend to Beant Singh.
Bhag Singh M.L.A., Smt. Nirlep Kaur M.L.A., Sadhu Singh Ghudani M.L.A., Malkit Singh Dakha, Kuldip Singh Mangewal, Former Chairman Verka, all belong to this city. 
Lakhvir Singh Lakha ( Payal ) President Of Youth Congress, Inderpreet Singh Mangewal, Dr. Virender Singh Mangewal are upcoming leaders of the region. 
Late Sardara Singh was also a M.C. of Doraha. He was a very good-natured person. He also developed the area in which he was a M.C.  recently.

Doraha is part of the Payal Assembly Constituency.

Education

Doraha city is the educational hub of the nearby villages and has many institutions which offer education from primary to graduate degree courses. The schools include Dashmesh Model Senior Secondary School, Guru Nanak Model Senior Secondary School, Mehta Gurukul Public School, Doraha Public School, Mount Litera, Saraswati Model Senior Secondary School, Aryaputri Pathshala, Kidzee and many more. Doraha College of Education (DCE) and Guru Nanak National College. Guru Nanak National College is the first institute of higher education in Doraha. It was founded by Dr. Ishwar Singh in 1974. Before this college, the boys and girls of the town and nearby villages went to Khanna and Ludhiana for higher education.

Business
The majority of population in Doraha is self-employed.

The first highway outlet of McDonald’s opened its operation on 25 March 2002.

References

Cities and towns in Ludhiana district
Ludhiana district